Germany competed at the 1992 Winter Paralympics in Tignes/Albertville, France. 36 competitors from Germany won 38 medals including 12 gold, 17 silver and 9 bronze and finished 2nd in the medal table.

See also 
 Germany at the Paralympics
 Germany at the 1992 Winter Olympics

References 

1992
1992 in German sport
Nations at the 1992 Winter Paralympics